Energijos Skirstymo Operatorius AB (ESO) is an electricity and gas distribution company in Lithuania. It was established on 1 January 2016 through merger of the Lithuanian electricity distribution network operator LESTO AB and a gas company Lietuvos dujos. ESO is controlled by a state-owned group of energy companies Ignitis Group which owns 94.98% of shares.  Its shares are traded on NASDAQ OMX Vilnius.

ESO is a member of National Lithuanian Electricity Association.

References

External links 

Electric power companies of Lithuania
Natural gas companies of Lithuania
Companies based in Vilnius
Energy companies established in 2016
Non-renewable resource companies established in 2016
Lithuanian companies established in 2016
Companies listed on Nasdaq Vilnius